Linouse Desravine (born 10 February 1991 in Cap-Haïtien) is a Haitian judoka who competes in the women's 52  kg category. At the 2012 Summer Olympics, she was Haiti's flag bearer, but she was defeated in the first round of her event.

She had previous won medals at the Central American and Caribbean Games and the Pan American Judo Championships.  She also later won another bronze at the Central American and Caribbean Games in 2014.

References

External links
 

Haitian female judoka
Living people
Olympic judoka of Haiti
Judoka at the 2012 Summer Olympics
Competitors at the 2010 Central American and Caribbean Games
Competitors at the 2014 Central American and Caribbean Games
Central American and Caribbean Games bronze medalists for Haiti
Judoka at the 2011 Pan American Games
Pan American Games competitors for Haiti
1991 births
Central American and Caribbean Games medalists in judo
People from Cap-Haïtien
20th-century Haitian women
21st-century Haitian women